Abdullah Al Anzi (Arabic:عبد الله العنزي) (born 9 January 1995) is a Qatari footballer who plays for Muaither as a forward.

Career

Al-Kharaitiyat
Al Anzi started his career at Al-Kharaitiyat and is a product of the Al-Kharaitiyat's youth system. On 22 September 2017, Al Anzi made his professional debut for Al-Kharaitiyat against Al-Rayyan in the Pro League, replacing Sanzhar Tursunov  .

Al-Sailiya
On 21 August 2019 left Al-Kharaitiyat and signed with Al-Sailiya.

External links

References

Living people
1995 births
Qatari footballers
Al Kharaitiyat SC players
Al-Sailiya SC players
Muaither SC players
Qatar Stars League players
Qatari Second Division players
Association football forwards
Place of birth missing (living people)